Alice Zeimann (born 28 July 1998) is a New Zealand beach volleyball player.

Biography 
Zeimann was born in Christchurch, New Zealand and attended Burnside High School. In 2019 she moved to the United States to study at the University of Minnesota, then transferred to Florida State University in 2020.

Zeimann and playing partner Shaunna Polley will represent New Zealand at the 2022 Commonwealth Games.

References

1998 births
Living people
Sportspeople from Christchurch
New Zealand beach volleyball players
Women's beach volleyball players
Commonwealth Games competitors for New Zealand
People educated at Burnside High School
University of Minnesota alumni
Beach volleyball players at the 2022 Commonwealth Games